Valdeande is a Spanish municipality in the province of Burgos in the autonomous community of Castile and León.

Valdeande is located on the north part of the shore of the Duero. It separate 27 kilometers of Aranda and 90 of towns. Clearly tie locality to agriculture, has in the Esgueva river its main fluvial course, that bathes the western part of the municipality creating an extensive fertile valley. History In the municipality they have been recognized, like older vestiges, different rest from the Roman time. This territory was crossed by one of the routes that Clunia with the valley of the Arlanza river united, being in its route the villa of Ciella. Other findings of crossings and wakes give certainty, also, of the possible existence of a small community hispanovisigoda in Valdeande. Valdeande also was present in Reconquista. While, the first written document appears in 1037, a manuscript of Fernando I of Castile. Forced places

Church of San Pedro Apostle
The church rises superficially on a parapet, constructed with stone of ashlar masonry and, the tower of the present bell tower, whose first stage could be related to the fortified tower of the 11th century. In the 13th century to the second body of the tower and the porch of the church would rise. In the construction different architectonic styles are mixed that they go from Romanesque the delayed one (porch), happening through gothic (large windows) and the Renaissance one (greater altar), until practically our days.

Old source
The monument is located in the high part of the town. It keeps the form from chapel and it presents/displays an access to the spring by means of a double door conformed by twin arcs of average point and that are in favor separated of a column. Its origin is medieval, although it has an inscription of the year 1703 that alludes to a reconstruction.

Archaeological Classroom of the Ciella Deposit
The classroom is located in the superior floor of the building of the old schools. With this project it is tried to contribute to the visitor a real perception of which it was and it meant east Roman rural establishment. The classroom is structured in two zones. First it serves as general information with audio-visual panels, scale models and. The second zone is a recreation, to real size, of some of the main rooms of the Roman mansion.

Ciella Deposit
One is to the northwest of Valdeande. In that place the fertile valley took advantage of the Esgueva river to install a Roman mansion of rural character, that was the center of an extensive agrarian operation. At traverse a road was arrived at the capital of the Roman Legal Convent, located in Clunia and from dista which 13 kilometers.

Goddess Madre
Also she has appeared a stone goddess-mother, that would be the great archaeological finding of the zone.

Berruguete Altarpiece
In altarpiece of the church of San Pedro, it is possibly the best altarpiece of the province of Towns. Painted in the second half of the 16th century, it cannot let visit itself.

Other places of interest
Hermitage of the Virgin of the Juncal. Municipal swimming pools. Celebrations 29 of June. San Pedro Apóstol. 15 of June. Virgin of Juncal.

References

External links
  Valdeande.com

Municipalities in the Province of Burgos
Enclaves and exclaves